Pat Lewis is an American soul singer and backing vocalist since the 1960s.

Biography
Patsy Lewis was born October 23, 1947 in Johnstown, Pennsylvania, United States, and moved to Detroit, Michigan in 1951. In the early 1960s, Pat, her sister Dianne, and two friends (Betty and Jackie Winston) formed the group, The Adorables, who recorded a record and began singing backing vocals for Golden World Records. Lewis debuted as a solo artist in 1966 with Can't Shake It Loose while also beginning to do outside backing vocals sessions. She met Motown Records' in-house backing group The Andantes, and one day when one of the girls could not make the session for Stevie Wonder's "Up-Tight", Lewis stepped in and did it as well as several other Motown sessions. She signed to Solid Hit Bound Records and released a string of singles, including "Look At What I Almost Missed", "Warning", "No One to Love", "No Baby No", and "The Loser". From the late 1960s on, she became a permanent backing singer for Aretha Franklin, Isaac Hayes and later on George Clinton too. She wrote several songs for Isaac Hayes.

Later years
In 1989, Lewis as well as The Andantes were among the invited artists to join UK producer Ian Levine's mega-project Motorcity Records, a label formed to record new material on former Motown artists. She became the main backing vocals co-ordinator for the label and did several hundred arrangements while she recorded more than 50 tracks with herself and as a lead singer for the re-formed Andantes. Her single Separation (1991) (co-written by Levine and Billy Griffin) was Single of the Week when reviewed in British soul magazine Blues & Soul. After the label's demise in 1992, she continued to work with Levine on a regular basis. In 1997, she recorded 50 cover versions of selected Motown and Northern Soul classics, although only a handful of tracks have been released on various artists compilations. In 1999, she recorded 76 gospel tracks with Levine for K-Tel.
As for the present, Lewis occasionally tours with Martha Reeves's original backing group The Vandellas and most recently performed in Manchester, England in October 2007; where she had also been scheduled to record a new track for Levine's album Disco 2008, an engagement she had to cancel due to health problems.

Albums
Separation (Motorcity, 1991)
The Best of Pat Lewis (Motorcity, 1996)
This Is Gospel (103rd Street Gospel Choir with Pat Lewis - 2CD - K-Tel, 2000)
A Gospel Christmas (K-Tel, 2000)

Singles
 "Can't Shake It Loose" (1966)
 "Look at What I Almost Missed" (1966)
 "Warning" (1967)
 "No One to Love" (1967)
 "No Baby No" (1967)
 "The Loser" (1967)
 "Separation" (1991)
 "No Right Turn" (1991)

References

External links

1947 births
Living people
People from Johnstown, Pennsylvania
Motown artists
20th-century African-American women singers